McHarg is a surname. Notable people with the surname include:

Alastair McHarg (born 1944), Scottish rugby union player
Elizabeth McHarg (1923–1999), Scottish mathematician
Ian McHarg (1920–2001), Scottish architect
Marilyn McHarg, member of the Canadian section of Médecins Sans Frontières (MSF)
Rodger McHarg (born 1947), New Zealand cricket umpire
Scott McHarg (born 1974), Scottish football player
Cameron McKenzie-McHarg (born 1980), Australian rower

See also
Mount McHarg, a mountain in western Canada
McHargue (surname)

Scottish surnames
Surnames of British Isles origin